Saša Ilić (born 5 September 1970) is a Macedonian former footballer who played as a goalkeeper.

Club career
Born in Skopje, Ilić made his senior debut with Vardar in the 1987–88 season. He spent two more seasons with the club, before moving to Partizan in 1990. After failing to receive any playing time in his debut season, Ilić went on loan to Spartak Subotica (1991–92) and Borac Banja Luka (1992–93). He returned to Partizan in the 1993–94 season, as the club won the double.

In early 1995, Ilić moved abroad to South Korean club Busan Daewoo Royals. He later spent three seasons with Hamburger SV from 1997 to 2000, making just two Intertoto Cup appearances.

After his second stint at Vardar, Ilić moved to Iran to play for Persepolis in the 2003–04 season and Esteghlal Ahvaz in the 2004–05 season. He also spent two and a half seasons with Pegah, helping them win promotion to the Persian Gulf Pro League in 2007.

In late 2013, at the age of 43, Ilić came out of retirement to play for Gorno Lisiče in the Macedonian First Football League.

International career
At international level, Ilić was capped three times for Macedonia, making his debut in a June 1997 World Cup qualifier versus Iceland. He also made two (non-official) appearances at the 2005 Tehran Cup.

Honours
Partizan
 First League of FR Yugoslavia: 1993–94
 FR Yugoslavia Cup: 1993–94

References

External links
 
 
 
 

1970 births
Living people
Footballers from Skopje
Yugoslav footballers
Macedonian footballers
Association football goalkeepers
North Macedonia international footballers
FK Vardar players
FK Partizan players
FK Spartak Subotica players
FK Borac Banja Luka players
Busan IPark players
Hamburger SV players
FC Dynamo Saint Petersburg players
Persepolis F.C. players
Esteghlal Ahvaz players
Pegah Gilan players
FK Gorno Lisiče players
Yugoslav First League players
First League of Serbia and Montenegro players
K League 1 players
Macedonian First Football League players
Russian First League players
Persian Gulf Pro League players
Azadegan League players
Macedonian expatriate footballers
Expatriate footballers in Serbia and Montenegro
Expatriate footballers in South Korea
Expatriate footballers in Germany
Expatriate footballers in Russia
Expatriate footballers in Iran
Macedonian expatriate sportspeople in Serbia and Montenegro
Macedonian expatriate sportspeople in South Korea
Macedonian expatriate sportspeople in Germany
Macedonian expatriate sportspeople in Russia
Macedonian expatriate sportspeople in Iran